Midnapore district  was a district of the state of West Bengal, India. This district was bifurcated on 1 January 2002 into the Purba Medinipur district and the Paschim Medinipur district. On 4 April 2017, the Jhargram subdivision of Paschim Medinipur district (which formed part of the undivided Midnapore district) was converted into Jhargram district.

Demographics

See also
Midnapore town
Partition of Midnapore

References

Former districts of West Bengal